Brookula finesia is a species of sea snail, a marine gastropod mollusk, unassigned in the superfamily Seguenzioidea.

Distribution
This marine species occurs off New South Wales, Australia.

References

 Laseron, C., 1954. Revision of the Liotiidae of New South Wales. Aust. Zool., 12(1):1-25

External links
 To World Register of Marine Species
 

finesia
Gastropods described in 1954